Sand drawing (or sandroing in Bislama) is a ni-Vanuatu artistic and ritual tradition and practice, recognised by UNESCO as a Masterpiece of the Oral and Intangible Heritage of Humanity.

Another form of art which implies drawing in the sand is sandpainting, but this process also implies the coloring of sand to create a colorful environment on a small or a large scale.

Description 

Sand drawing is produced in sand, volcanic ash or clay. It consists of "a continuous meandering line on an imagined grid to produce a graceful, often symmetrical, composition of geometric patterns". The artist's implement is a single finger.

UNESCO describes sand drawing as:

Artists such as Pablo Picasso were known for drafting their visual ideas in the sand. Norman Joseph Woodland, inventor of the barcode, came up with his invention by drawing it in the sand.

Correlated forms of art 

Sand drawings are associated with the Indian sand mandalas because of the geometry-driven shapes it delivers through the manipulation of sand. The work of making patterns in the sand with a rake is also evocative of the Karesansui practice in traditional Japanese rock gardens, and of the large scale Nazca Lines in Peru.

Since the traditional art of sand drawing is so precisely geometrical, academic research is being led to associate the (ethno-) mathematical patterns held in this art, and correlate it with modern mathematics to get a sense of the potential scientific knowledge carried by the builders of the civilizations practicing it. The ancient Greek mathematician studying geometry by drawing figures in the sand also leads to the idea that traditional Sandroings convey much more than a pleasing visual effect.

Vanuatu (Sandroings) 

The Vanuatu Cultural Centre has noted that the spirit of sand drawing tends to disappear, only a few practitioners still master the special techniques of sand drawing. Nowadays, this form of art is mainly used as a graphic layout for advertising or tourism ends, and its original sense and purpose is getting lost. A National Action Plan for the Safeguarding of Sand Drawing has been initiated by the Centre, together with the Save Sand Drawings Action Committee; the programme is sponsored by UNESCO. The project notably led to a National Sand Drawing Festival, as from 2004.

The Turaga indigenous movement based on Pentecost Island write using Avoiuli, an alphabet inspired by designs found in traditional sand drawings. Sand drawing is interpreted as a key visual medium in a country where more than 100 languages are spoken.

Pitjantjatjara (Milpatjunanyi) 

In the Pitjantjatjara dialect of North Central Australia, the word Milpatjunanyi means "the art of telling stories in the sand". In this culture, the storytellers, often women, have a ritual approach to the process, using a stick that is first pressed against the body to create a connection, and also used as a drumstick to bring musical rhythm to the story. The sand drawing communication technique is also used in schools.

Artists

Non-traditional artists 
 Jim Denevan, American chef and artist from the surf culture, creates large scale sand drawing on California beaches during low tides.
 Andres Amador, American computer technician turned sand artist, draws large-scale organic patterns on beaches, mainly in the Pacific.
 Andrew Magdy, Egyptian lawyer turned sand artist, draws precise small-scale work on glass boards.
 Michael Heizer, American land artist who created large scale sand drawings in the Nevada desert with the trail of his motorcycle (Double Negative, 1969-1970).
 Andy Goldsworthy, British land artist, author of Dark Dry Sand Drawing in 1987, which inspired a generation of Western sand artists.

Technologies 
In 2015, the Disney corporation launched the BeachBot, a robot designed to make large-scale sand drawings. The robot fills a 30-square-foot with drawings from Disney's most popular movies.

See also
 Sandpainting
 Kolam – Tamil sandpainting

References

Vanuatuan culture
Drawing
Masterpieces of the Oral and Intangible Heritage of Humanity
Sand art